The Marder I "Marten" (Sd.Kfz. 135) was a German World War II tank destroyer, armed with a 75 mm Pak-40 anti-tank gun. Most Marder Is were built on the base of the Tracteur Blindé 37L (Lorraine), a French artillery tractor/armoured personnel carrier of which the Germans had acquired more than three hundred after the Fall of France in 1940.

History

From the early stages of Operation Barbarossa the Wehrmacht became aware that their ability to combat some of the Soviet tanks was inadequate. The lighter tanks then in general service, such as the Panzer II and the Czech built 38(t), were under-armoured and did not mount an adequate gun to deal with the newer Soviet tanks. In addition, the standard towed anti-tank gun of the Wehrmacht, the 37 mm 3.7 cm Pak 36, was both difficult to get into position quickly and lacked the ability to penetrate the heavy sloped armour of the new Soviet tanks.  What was needed was a more powerful anti-tank gun that was mobile. The Germans possessed such a gun in the 75 mm 7.5 cm Pak 40. They also had come into possession of a large number of captured Soviet 76 mm F-22 Model 1936 divisional field guns. The Germans had experience in taking the chassis of an under-gunned tank to provide mobility to a heavier gun. The Panzerjäger I is such an example, where the turret was removed for an open conversion to allow the gunners the necessary room to operate the gun.

With the shock of having units overrun by new Soviet T-34 medium tanks and KV-1 heavy tanks, the need for a heavier-gunned German tank became urgent.  As an interim solution, it was decided to use captured French vehicles such as the Lorraine, and less effective German tanks such as the Panzer II and Panzer 38(t) as the basis for makeshift tank destroyers. The result was the Marder series, comprising the Marder I, Marder II, and Marder III respectively.  These vehicles provided mobility to either the 7.62 cm Pak 36(r) (a conversion of the 76 mm F-22 Model 1936) gun or in later versions the German 7.5 cm Pak 40 anti-tank gun. Due to the weight and space constraints of the small chassis, the Marder series were not fully armoured. Thin upper armour protection was provided only for the front and sides against shrapnel and small arms only. All Marder series had open tops. Some were issued with canvas covers to protect the crew from the elements. The Marder series were not a proper Panzerjäger that could exchange fire with enemy tanks.

Development

The Marder I was developed in May 1942 by Major Alfred Becker.  It carried the 75 mm Pak 40 anti-tank gun on a Lorraine chassis.  As the gun was relatively large, the original crew compartment superstructure was removed to create the space needed to work the gun.  This was done by Baustokommando Becker, an organization in occupied France converting French armoured fighting vehicles for internal security use.  The gun was then mounted atop the chassis. Alkett, working in conjunction with Becker, produced the angled armour shielding for the crew compartment. The shielding was relatively light, and was open from above.  The shielding provided the crew with protection from blast and small arms fire, but was not intended to stop armour piercing rounds. The vehicle's primary function was to provide mobility to the anti-tank gun. It was not intended as a replacement for a tank.

Between July and August 1942, 170 Marder Is were built on the Lorraine chassis.  Later, several other French and Polish tanks were used as the conversion base for the Marder I, including the Hotchkiss H39 and FCM 36. These conversions were also completed in 1942 by Baustokommando Becker at the Hotchkiss plant on the outskirts of Paris, 24 Hotchkiss tanks were converted into a Marder I, the 7,5 cm Pak 40 (Sf) auf Geschützwagen 39H(f). The Marder Is initially served in infantry divisions on the Eastern Front and met with good success. They later made up a significant component of the armoured fighting vehicles of the reformed 21st Panzer Division in Normandy.

Combat history

The first Lorraine-based Marder I vehicles were sent to the Eastern Front in 1942 to serve in the Panzerjäger (tank destroyer) units of infantry divisions.

This is a list of Infantry Divisions operating on the Eastern Front known to have used Marder Is and the estimated time frame they were used

"On 14 August 1942, ... Gen.Qu. was requested to include 72 - 7.5cm Pak40 (Marder I) Lorraine on Blitztransport trains." (6 initially noted divisions issued 9 and then 10 Marder I "in accordance with K.St.N.1148a dated 15Feb42 for a Panzerjäger-Kompanie (9 Sfl.)" then "10 7.5cm Pak40/1 auf Sfl. Lorraine-Schlepper and organized in accordance with K.St.N.1148a dated 1Dec42."   
Alfred Becker notes: "By Christmas 1942 almost all of Becker’s men had reached Paris. In exchange for the men Becker provided the commander of the 227th Infantry Division with 20 of his armoured vehicles.[22]".  This follows on from the ground breaking pre-Pz. div. developmental use of the Becker's first conversion vehicles: 12x 10.5 cm leFH 16 Geschützwagen Mk VI 736 (e) & six of the larger 15 cm sFH13 guns on Mk VI 736(e) by the 227th Inf. Div.

"Two additional leFH18/4 (Sf.) mounted on Lorraine Schlepper chassis were completed with a modified superstructure (similar in design and purpose to the 38t Grille sIG 33, with an additional 12 built for and used by the 2 PzGren Regts of 21 Pz. div.) and delivered in early December 1942 as a new Sturmgeschütz-Zug for the 15.Batterie/Artillerie-Regiment 227."  (Of 227th Inf.Div.).

"An additional 64 sFH13 (after the first 30 built in June 42 and shipped to Rommel) were mounted on Lorraine-Schlepper chassis at Wa A Paris in July and August 1942.  Gepanzerte Artillerie-Regiment 1 (Sfl) and 2 (Sfl) were each issued 30 sFH14 auf Sfl. To fill their five batteries.".

Gallery

See also

Comparable vehicles
 German Marder II and III
 Italian Semovente da 75/34
 Romanian TACAM T-60 and TACAM R-2
 Soviet SU-76 and ZiS-30
 Spanish Verdeja 75 mm

References

External links

 Marder I (Panzerjaeger Lr S 7,5 cm Pak 40/1 on French chassis), Catalog of Enemy Ordnance, U.S. Office of Chief of Ordnance, 1945 
 Marder Series, Achtung Panzer 

World War II tank destroyers of Germany
Military vehicles introduced from 1940 to 1944